The following is an alphabetical list of members of the United States House of Representatives from the state of Maine.  For chronological tables of members of both houses of the United States Congress from the state (through the present day), see United States congressional delegations from Maine.  The list of names should be complete, but other data may be incomplete.

Current members

List of members of the U.S. House of Representatives

See also

List of United States senators from Maine
United States congressional delegations from Maine
Maine's congressional districts

References

Maine

United States rep